Deibert is a surname of German origin. Notable people with the surname include:

Adam Deibert, American musician and voice actor 
Michael Deibert (born 1973), American journalist
Ronald Deibert (born 1964), Canadian professor
Scott Deibert (born 1970), Canadian football player

References

Surnames of German origin
Surnames from given names